Saucony  is an American brand of athletic footwear and apparel. Founded in 1898, the company is owned by Wolverine World Wide. Products commercialised by Saucony include footwear and clothing ranges, such as athletic shoes, jackets, hoodies, t-shirts, sweatpants, shorts, and socks. Accessories include hats and backpacks.

Saucony's shoe boxes once had the phrase "sock a knee" printed on them, which represents the correct pronunciation of the company's name. The Saucony brand logo represents the Saucony Creek's constant flow, and the boulders lining its creek bed.
The company is a popular racing shoe producer, making track spikes and cross country racing flats. Saucony also makes shoes for specific track and field athletics events.

History

The Saucony Shoe Manufacturing Company's first factory was founded in 1898 at Kutztown, Pennsylvania, on the high banks of the Saucony Creek (from which the company would get its name) by four businessmen. In 1910, Russian immigrant Abraham R. Hyde started a shoe company, A.R. Hyde and Sons, in Cambridge, Massachusetts. Over the years, Hyde became known for making athletic footwear including brands such as SpotBilt and PF Flyers. On June 13, 1968, Hyde entered into an agreement to buy Saucony, and the sale was completed on October 24, 1968. 

In 1979, two of Saucony's running shoes were selected in the top 10 by Runner's World magazine (the Hornet was chosen best value), and by the following spring the demand for the product had gone up 2,000%. In the late 1980s, when Saucony became Hyde's dominant brand, the name of the company was officially changed from Hyde Athletic Industries to Saucony.

In 2005, Saucony was acquired by Stride Rite Corporation for $170 million. Stride Rite was acquired in 2007 for $800 million by Payless ShoeSource.  The combined company became known as Collective Brands. In 2012, Collective Brands' Performance Lifestyle Group, which included Saucony, along with Keds, Stride Rite and Sperry Top-Sider, became part of Wolverine World Wide in a $1.23 billion transaction that also involved the sale of Payless ShoeSource and Collective Licensing International to private equity firms Blum Capital Partners and Golden Gate Capital. In 2016, Wolverine World Wide relocated Saucony and its other Boston-area brands to a new regional headquarters location in Waltham, Massachusetts.

Wolverine World Wide sources a majority of its footwear from numerous third party manufacturers in Asia Pacific and South America.

Footwear

The company offers a variety of shoes, such as running, trail running, racing, walking, and a college collection. Each of these types of shoes utilizes specific technology relevant to the type of targeted activity. The shoes are designed for 3 main purposes: racing, running, and walking. Shoes are also made by focusing on the runner's foot size, type of running, arch type, pronation, and running location.

On April 3, 2018, Saucony teamed up with the Massachusetts-based doughnut and coffee company, Dunkin' Donuts to produce a strawberry-frosted donut-themed running shoe to commemorate the 122nd running of the Boston Marathon. The Saucony X Dunkin’ Kinvara 9 comes in a donut box. The heel of the shoe is covered in rainbow sprinkles. The company again released a Dunkin' themed running shoe, the Kinvara 10,  in March 2019.

Originals
Originals are Saucony's heritage range, which includes reintroduced older shoe styles produced by the company, which have been improved with better materials and different colorways. These include the popular Shadow model, Jazz model, and Hornet model. The latter of which remains the company's biggest selling product.

Sponsorship 
The company sponsors and has sponsored many athletes, including:
 Molly Huddle, American long-distance runner
 Laura Thweatt, American long-distance runner  
 Jared Ward, American long-distance runner
 Lisa Brooking, Canadian long-distance runner

References

External links

 

Wolverine World Wide
Shoe brands
Companies based in Lexington, Massachusetts
Clothing companies established in 1898
1898 establishments in Pennsylvania